An idiom is an expression with a figurative meaning (not deducible from the individual words of the expression).

Idiom may also refer to:
 Idiom (language structure), the realized structure of a language, as opposed to other possible structures
 Variety (linguistics), a neutral term for labeling speech forms, without respect to their status as 'language' or 'dialect'
 Instrumental idiom, a concept in music
 Programming idiom, a concept in computer science
 Idiom Island, an island in Montana in the Yellowstone River
 Idiom, a company acquired by SDL PLC

See also
 Idiom Neutral
 Idiom in English language